La chiquita piconera is a painting by Julio Romero de Torres. Finished in February 1930, it is considered the last complete work by Romero de Torres before his death. The female model was María Teresa López, age 13 or 14 at the time. The work primarily oozes erotism, displaying a number of sexual fetishes recurring in the artist's portfolio. In the light of the common underlying theme of prostitution and the saliency of the stocking and the brazier, the work has been compared to Francisco de Goya's capricho .

The painting (sized 100 cm × 80 cm) is exhibited at the Julio Romero de Torres Museum in Córdoba.

References 
Citations

Bibliography
 
 

1930 paintings
Erotic art
Paintings by Julio Romero de Torres